Metal Church is an American heavy metal band. They originally formed in San Francisco, California in 1980 and then relocated to Aberdeen, Washington the following year and briefly using the name Shrapnel. Led by guitarist and songwriter Kurdt Vanderhoof, the band has released twelve studio albums, and is often credited as a formative influence on the thrash metal subgenre, melding the aesthetics of the new wave of British heavy metal and American hard rock with "incredibly tight musicianship" and "piercingly screeched" vocals. They are also considered to be an integral part of the Seattle heavy metal music scene of the 1980s, and achieved considerable popularity that decade, with two of their first three albums entering the Top 100 on the Billboard 200 chart. The band's early lyrical topics such as conflict and paranoia later expanded into philosophical and social commentary.

Metal Church has had a revolving door of vocalists, guitarists, bassists and drummers throughout its -year career, and Vanderhoof remains the group's sole consistent creative, despite reducing his role strictly to composition in 1986 after tiring of performing. The "classic" lineup of Vanderhoof, vocalist David Wayne, guitarist Craig Wells, bassist Duke Erickson, and drummer Kirk Arrington recorded the band's first two studio albums, Metal Church (1984) and their major breakthrough The Dark (1986). By the end of the 1980s, Vandehoof and Wayne had parted ways with the band and were replaced by vocalist Mike Howe and guitarist John Marshall respectively. Metal Church's popularity continued with their third album Blessing in Disguise (1989), which spawned one of their best-known songs "Badlands". After releasing two more studio albums with Howe, the band called it quits in 1996.

Metal Church reformed in 1998 with most of their "classic" lineup, including Vanderhoof's return to performance, resulting in the Masterpeace album. They endured numerous lineup changes thereafter, releasing three further studio albums while fronted by Ronny Munroe before disbanding once again in July 2009. The group reunited for the second time in October 2012, and released their tenth studio album Generation Nothing a year later. Following Munroe's departure in the fall of 2014, Metal Church considered disbanding for the third time before Howe was rehired in April 2015 as the band's lead singer. He recorded two more albums with the group, which enjoyed a renewed popularity in the mid-to-late 2010s, before his death on July 26, 2021.

History

Formative years (1980–1984) 
Then based in San Francisco, Kurdt Vanderhoof formed the band in 1980 with various musicians. This era included a brief audition period with future Metallica drummer Lars Ulrich. The three-song, instrumental Red Skies demo appeared in 1981, featuring Vanderhoof, guitarist Rick Condrin, bassist Steve Hott, and drummer Aaron Zimpel.

Vanderhoof returned to his hometown of Aberdeen in 1981 and began the new group Shrapnel with Craig Wells, Duke Erickson, drummer Tom Weber, and vocalist Mike Murphy.  Murphy departed before their next demo, which was recorded without vocals, and Weber departed shortly thereafter. The enlistment of Kirk Arrington and David Wayne completed the group's classic lineup. They released the demo Four Hymns and spent following years touring and accruing material, readopting the Metal Church moniker in 1983. The song "Death Wish" is featured on the compilation album Northwest Metalfest.

First two records and commercial success (1984–1988) 
In 1984, they released their self-titled debut album, which included three songs from the Four Hymns demo and a cover of Deep Purple's "Highway Star". They sold 70,000 copies of the album independently before signing to Elektra. According to Wayne, Ulrich and Metallica bandmate James Hetfield urged Elektra to sign the band before another label did.

By the time Metal Church released their second studio album, The Dark, in 1986, they were touring with high-profile acts like Metallica. The Dark was a commercial success, helped by the fact that the band's first music video, "Watch the Children Pray", received frequent airplay on MTV. As a result, the album managed to enter the Billboard 200, and saw Metal Church support the album with a world tour from October 1986 to July 1987, playing with bands like King Diamond, Celtic Frost, Testament, Overkill, D.R.I., Trouble and, individually, with each of the "big four" of thrash metal (Metallica, Megadeth, Slayer and Anthrax).

Shortly after the album's release, however, they were plagued by lineup changes: Vanderhoof ceased performing with the group in 1986, to be replaced briefly by Mark Baker and more extensively by John Marshall. Vanderhoof nonetheless continued to work with the group in composing thereafter, co-writing much of their subsequent material. Wayne also departed shortly thereafter and was replaced by former Heretic singer Mike Howe. Wayne teamed up with the remaining members of Heretic to form Reverend.

Further albums and first breakup (1989–1996) 
With Howe and Marshall, Metal Church released their third studio album, Blessing in Disguise, in 1989.  Critics responded favorably, including some assertions that the record was the group's strongest effort. Blessing in Disguise was even more successful than its predecessors, peaking at number 75 on the Billboard 200; this was Metal Church's highest chart position, until it was surpassed 27 years later by XI. The album's success was attributed to the music video for "Badlands" getting airplay on MTV's Headbangers Ball, and its opening track "Fake Healer" receiving some attention from mainstream radio stations, most notably KNAC and Z Rock; unlike "Badlands", however, no music video was released for "Fake Healer". After spending much of 1989 and 1990 touring heavily behind Blessing in Disguise (performing with numerous bands such as Metallica, W.A.S.P., Accept, Annihilator, Saxon, Meliah Rage, Forced Entry and D.B.C.), the band was dropped from Elektra.

Metal Church released its fourth studio album, The Human Factor, on Epic Records in 1991. Critics applauded the group for transitioning to a major label and successfully retaining the vitality of their sound, while also releasing a record with conceptual accessibility beyond the heavy metal genre. Unlike their previous two albums, however, The Human Factor failed to chart on the Billboard 200.

The band followed with their fifth studio album, 1993's Hanging in the Balance on Mercury Records. After touring almost non-stop in support of that album for about two years, Metal Church officially disbanded in 1996, citing management problems and poor record sales as factors.

Reunion of classic lineup and Masterpeace (1998–2001) 

The members of Metal Church began compiling their first live album in 1998, Live, which featured songs from their first two records performed by their classic lineup. During the production of Live, Wayne, Vanderhoof, Wells, Arrington, and Erickson decided to reform the band and began work on a new studio album.  Wells was forced to depart the band due to familial obligations, however, and was replaced by the returning Marshall. The live album Live in Japan (recorded on the band's 1995 Japanese tour) was also released in 1998, only in Japan.

The resulting album, Masterpeace, was released in 1999 on Nuclear Blast Records. Critics responded positively, hailing it as a focused product that increased the energy over previous releases, despite it ultimately failing to break new ground.  Arrington and Erickson were unable to tour behind the record, so the band enlisted members of Vanderhoof's side projects, bassist Brian Lake and drummer Jeff Wade, for live performances later that year.

Wayne expressed regret regarding the record, which influenced his musical output that followed. He again departed in 2001 due to personal and creative differences, forming the group Wayne with Wells and releasing the curiously titled debut album Metal Church thereafter. Vanderhoof objected to the album's name and cover art; according to Wayne, the purpose of the album's name was to alert the audience of his involvement. Erickson and Marshall also ceased involvement with Metal Church after Wayne's departure.

Munroe-led lineup, Wayne's death, and second breakup (2002–2009) 
Vanderhoof's eponymous band released A Blur in Time in 2002, and he began working on new material for Metal Church's next album thereafter.  In 2003, he and Arrington recruited singer Ronny Munroe, ex-Malice guitarist Jay Reynolds, and bassist Steve Unger to form a new lineup of Metal Church. The band's seventh studio album, The Weight of the World, was released in the following year. Critics generally reacted to the record with a lukewarm response, recognizing its accomplishments while noting its lack of consistency and innovation.

On May 10, 2005, David Wayne died of complications from injuries sustained in a car accident that occurred months before. He was 47 years old.

In 2006, Arrington left the band due to health complications with diabetes. His replacement was Jeff Plate, who previously worked with Savatage, Chris Caffery and the Trans-Siberian Orchestra.  Later that year, the band released their eighth studio album, A Light in the Dark, which featured a re-recording of "Watch the Children Pray" as a tribute to Wayne. Vanderhoof said that the tribute was a way of showing fans that he harbored no ill will towards Wayne despite the contentious situation that existed between them before Wayne's death.

Reynolds left the group in 2008 and was replaced by Rick Van Zandt.  The band's ninth studio album, This Present Wasteland, followed in 2008, which was hailed generally as an effective release consistent with their previous material.  After subsequent touring, the band took a hiatus from performing due to Vanderhoof's back problems. They nonetheless continued studio work, while Munroe and Vanderhoof also completed the former's solo album.

After Vanderhoof's health improved, they returned to performing and composing new material.  On July 7, 2009, however, the group announced unexpectedly that they were disbanding following a final performance at Rocklahoma two days later, cancelling numerous further live dates. They cited industry frustrations as a major factor influencing the decision. Several former members remained musically active, including Munroe and Vanderhoof in Presto Ballet and Plate in Machines of Grace.

Second reformation, Generation Nothing and rotating singers (2012–2015) 

In October 2012, the band announced resumption of activity around a lineup featuring Vanderhoof, Munroe, Unger, Reynolds (soon replaced by Van Zandt), and Plate. Their first performances came the following January during the 70,000 Tons of Metal event, a heavy metal cruise. During one of these two shows, the band performed their debut album, Metal Church, in its entirety. Shortly thereafter, Vanderhoof told Music Life Radio that Metal Church had been working on a new album. In order to promote their tenth studio album, the band played festivals in the summer of 2013. The album, Generation Nothing, was released in October.

Munroe left the band in September 2014 to "pursue other interests". The band announced its plans to continue nonetheless. On April 30, 2015, Metal Church announced on their Facebook page that former singer Mike Howe had rejoined the band, some 20 years after first leaving the band.

According to Howe, Metal Church was on the verge of disbanding once more before he agreed to rejoin the band. He explained to Spotlight Report in May 2016: "Kurdt Vanderhoof got ahold of me in August of 2014, and he proposed [me] coming back to the band. He said Ronny [Munroe] left the band and he didn't really wanna carry on with Metal Church unless maybe I would consider coming back. So I said, 'Well, I don't know. I'm open to it. But let's see what kind of music we can come up with.' So Kurdt went back to the studio and started writing songs in the vein of 'Hanging In The Balance', where we left off twenty years ago, and he sent them to me over the Internet. And I was, like, 'Damn! The guy still has it and he's doing great work.' So he sent me another batch, and that batch was just as good [as], if not better than, the other. So, from there, I said, 'Well, I can't say no to this. And let's just see how it goes.' And we started writing lyrics and getting together, and it's morphed into being back in Aberdeen in the studio making the new Metal Church record."

XI and Damned If You Do (2016–2020)
Metal Church released their eleventh studio album, XI, on March 25, 2016, and it was their first album with Howe on vocals since 1993's Hanging in the Balance. Hailed by some critics as a comeback album, XI received positive reviews from critics, and was Metal Church's first album in 27 years (since Blessing in Disguise) to enter the Billboard 200; the album peaked at number 57, making it the band's highest chart position in their career. On the album's supporting tour, guitarist Rick Van Zandt had to go in for emergency eye surgery to repair a detached retina, and was temporarily replaced by former Firewolfe guitarist Paul Kleff, and Savatage guitarist Chris Caffery. The band co-headlined a West Coast North American tour with Armored Saint in June 2016, and along with Amon Amarth, Suicidal Tendencies and Butcher Babies, they supported Megadeth on the latter's Dystopia tour in September–October 2016.

When asked in October 2016 if he intended write another album with Metal Church, Howe stated, "We have every intention of doing that and that's what it's all about. If you're not putting on new music, then it's time to go away for me. In Metal Church... it's always been like a two-year cycle band, but we put our album out this year in March. So our album is actually only being out for six months. But we have plans on this fall getting back to writing and try to put something out next year. We're also looking at some dates for the spring possibly back in the States and maybe back over here. But our drummer Jeff, he's also on the TSO. He leaves from the end of October through December. So we might take that time to start writing new record."

Metal Church released a live album on April 28, 2017, titled Classic Live, which was recorded on the 2016 XI tour. This is the band's first live album since 1998's Live in Japan, and their first live album with Howe on vocals.

On March 21, 2017, drummer Jeff Plate announced his departure from Metal Church. As the result of his departure, the band withdrew from a U.S. tour with Alter Bridge and In Flames that was scheduled to take place in May 2017. Plate was replaced by former W.A.S.P. drummer Stet Howland.

In a May 2017 interview, Vanderhoof stated that Metal Church had begun writing and demoing their twelfth studio album, which would be tentatively due in early 2018.

On October 1, 2018, Metal Church teased an audio sample of a song from their twelfth studio album. The album, Damned If You Do, was announced shortly after and it was released on December 7, 2018. In support of Damned If You Do, Metal Church co-headlined a North American tour with Doro in April–May 2019, and performed at Megadeth's first-ever Megacruise that October.

In a July 2019 interview with Italy's Metalforce, Howe said that Metal Church would likely begin writing new material in 2020. Vanderhoof stated in an interview with Metal Wani in April 2020 that Metal Church would "probably start writing that later in the summer." He concluded, "We're gonna sit and we're gonna wait till there's a new album, and then we'll go out and do the normal promoting it or backing it up by touring and playing shows. But we're gonna wait till there's a new record."

Metal Church released their first compilation album From the Vault on April 10, 2020. It contains four new studio tracks, five B-side tracks from the Damned If You Do sessions, three song covers and two tracks culled from their performance at Club Citta in Kawasaki, Japan. The band stated on their Facebook page in July 2021 that their thirteenth studio album would be released in 2022.

Howe's death and new singer (2021–present)
On July 26, 2021, Metal Church announced that Howe had died that morning at his home in Eureka, California, at the age of 55. His death was ruled to be a suicide by hanging. In October 2021, after announcing the return of his short-lived early 1990s band Hall Aflame, Vanderhoof hinted on his Facebook page that Metal Church would continue on with a yet-to-be-announced replacement for Howe. A month later, drummer Stet Howland revealed that he and the remaining members of the band had started to "communicate again" following Howe's death. Although he did not specify the current state of Metal Church, Howland declared, "We're all slowly digesting. We just started talking again a few weeks ago, and we're barely talking about anything except making jokes, and we have our banter, we're starting to joke and communicated again together. Building on the future will come, but right now... we're just like hugging right now, we're all like 'I love you, man'. That's kind of where we're at. I know everybody wants to know more, when there's more you'll hear about it." By mid-2022, rumors suggested that Ronny Munroe would rejoin the band, but resulted in him joining Vicious Rumors.

In a September 2022 interview with Metal Rules, Vanderhoof revealed that the band has found a replacement for Howe, but added that they were "keeping a lid" on the identity of their new singer "for the time being." He also revealed that a new Metal Church album, which they had begun writing just before Howe's death, will be released in 2023. The band is scheduled to play one of their first shows in four years at Belgium's Alcatraz Open Air in August 2023.

On February 2, 2023, Metal Church announced Marc Lopes as their new lead vocalist.

Band members 

Current members
 Kurdt Vanderhoof – rhythm guitar ; co-composition 
 Steve Unger – bass, backing vocals 
 Rick Van Zandt – lead guitar 
 Stet Howland – drums 
 Marc Lopes – lead vocals  

Touring musicians
 Paul Kleff – lead guitar 
 Chris Caffery – lead guitar 
 Ira Black – rhythm guitar 
 Bobby Ferkovich – bass 

Former members
 William McKay – lead vocals 
 Ed Bull – lead vocals 
 Rick Condrin – lead guitar 
 Steve Hott – bass 
 Rick Wagner – drums 
 Aaron Zimpel – drums 
 Carl Sacco – drums 
 Duke Erickson – bass 
 Craig Wells – lead guitar 
 Mike Murphy – lead vocals 
 Tom Weber – drums 
 Kirk Arrington – drums 
 David Wayne – lead vocals 
 Mark Baker – rhythm guitar 
 John Marshall – rhythm guitar ; lead guitar 
 Mike Howe –  lead vocals 
 Brian Lake – bass 
 Jeff Wade – drums 
 Ronny Munroe – lead vocals  
 Jay Reynolds – lead guitar 
 Jeff Plate – drums

Timeline

Discography 

Studio albums
 Metal Church (1984) 
 The Dark (1986)
 Blessing in Disguise (1989)
 The Human Factor (1991)
 Hanging in the Balance (1993)
 Masterpeace (1999)
 The Weight of the World (2004)
 A Light in the Dark (2006)
 This Present Wasteland (2008)
 Generation Nothing (2013)
 XI (2016)
 Damned If You Do (2018)

Live albums
 Live (1998)
 Live in Japan (1998)
 Classic Live (2017)

Compilation albums
 From the Vault (2020)

Demos
 Red Skies (1981)
 Hitman (1983)
 Four Hymns (1983)

Singles
 "Gods of Wrath" (1985)
 "Start the Fire" (1986)
 "Watch the Children Pray" (1986)
 "Iron Man" (1988) (with Sir Mix-a-Lot)
 "Badlands" (1989)
 "Fake Healer" (1989)
 "Date with Poverty" (1991)
 "In Harm's Way" (1991)
 "In Mourning" (1991)
 "The Human Factor" (1991)
 "Gods of Second Chance" (1993)
 "Mirror of Lies" (2006)
 "No Tomorrow" (2016)
 "Killing Your Time" (2016)
 "Reset" (2016)
 "Needle and Suture" (2016)
 "Fake Healer" (2017) (with Todd La Torre)
 "Damned If You Do" (2018)
 "By the Numbers" (2018)

References

External links 
Official website

 
 

1980 establishments in California
American thrash metal musical groups
American power metal musical groups
American speed metal musical groups
Heavy metal musical groups from California
Heavy metal musical groups from Washington (state)
Musical groups established in 1980
Musical groups disestablished in 1996
Musical groups reestablished in 1998
Musical groups disestablished in 2009
Musical groups reestablished in 2012
Musical groups from San Francisco
Musical groups from Seattle
Musical quintets
Thrash metal musical groups from California